Michel Gérard Joseph Colucci (28 October 1944 – 19 June 1986), better known under his stage name Coluche, was a French stage comedian and cinema actor. He adopted Coluche as a stage name at age 26, when he began his entertainment career. He became known for his irreverent attitude towards politics and the establishment, and he incorporated this into much of his material. He was one of the first major comedians to regularly use profanities as a source of humor on French television. He also founded the charity "Les Restaurants du Cœur" which still provides free meals and other products to people in need.

Early life
Colucci was born on 28 October 1944, just weeks after the Liberation of Paris, in a hospital in the 14th arrondissement of the city. His mother, Simone Bouyer (called "Monette"), worked as a florist in the Boulevard du Montparnasse. His father, Honorio Colucci, from Casalvieri in Lazio, Italy, was a painter and decorator. His father died in 1947 at age 31 from poliomyelitis; his wife struggled thereafter to raise the young Michel and his sister (Danièle, 18 months older than Michel) on a meagre salary.

Coluche showed little promise at school, and left after completing his primary studies (June 1958). He tried various temporary jobs, and had several run-ins with authorities. During this time his mother bought him a guitar, which he taught himself to play. In 1964 he joined the 60th Infantry Regiment de Lons-le-Saunier, but was imprisoned for insubordination. On his return to civilian life, he worked in his mother's florist shop which she had been able to open on rue d'Aligre, and later in a larger shop which she opened near la Gare de Lyon. He found this work dull, and suddenly quit, which caused a long-lasting breach with his mother.

At the end of the 1960s he tried his luck as a singer in cafes, then turned to comedy.

Success
In 1969, with Romain Bouteille he was present at the start of the Café de la Gare, meeting place of a group of young comedic actors practically all of whom were to become famous: Patrick Dewaere, Henri Guybet, Miou-Miou, Martin Lamotte, etc. Among the patrons of the Café de la Gare were Georges Moustaki, Raymond Devos, Jean Ferrat, Jacques Brel, Leni Escudero, Pierre Perret and Jean Yanne. Later they were joined by Gérard Lanvin, Renaud, Rufus, Diane Kurys, Coline Serreau, Anémone, Gérard Depardieu, Thierry Lhermitte, Josiane Balasko and Gérard Jugnot.

Coluche's first sketch C'est l'histoire d'un mec (It's the story of a guy) was about the difficulties of telling a funny story. He quickly found success, but alcohol problems forced him to leave the group.

He went on to found another group, Le vrai chic parisien (The true Parisian chic) and it was then that he met his future wife, Véronique Kantor. They married in 1975 and had two sons, Marius and Romain Colucci. His behaviour and addictions forced him to leave the new group and launch his solo career.

Solo career
It was at this point that he began to dress in his well-known outfit of white tennis shoes, blue striped overalls, a bright yellow T-shirt and round glasses. He became famous with his parody of a TV game (Le Schmilblick). He was sacked by the radio stations Europe 1 and Radio Monte Carlo for vulgarity.

1980s

Presidential bid 

In a 30 October 1980 press conference at the theatre of his one-man show, Coluche announced his candidacy for the French presidential election. He was not taken seriously until the Sunday newspaper Le Journal du Dimanche published a poll on 14 December 1980 showing Coluche supported by 16% of potential voters. His "campaign" was supported and organized by Parisian publisher Charlie Hebdo, with slogans such as "Before me, France was divided in two; now it will be folded in four" (more idiomatically "être plié en quatre" could be translated as "doubled over laughing"), and "Coluche - the only candidate who has no reason to lie". However, he withdrew after pressure from serious politicians - including François Mitterrand who saw him as a menace for his own candidacy - and the murder of his manager René Gorlin.

César 

In 1984 Coluche was awarded the César Award for Best Actor for his role in the film Tchao Pantin (1983) directed by Claude Berri, a film that mirrored his chaotic personal life.

Restaurants du Cœur 

In September 1985, he launched the "Restaurants du Cœur" (usually called Restos du cœur) charity (40,000 volunteers in almost 2,500 eating establishments, which serve some 600,000 daily beneficiaries) in a speech on the radio station Europe 1. The charity collects food, money and clothes for the needy and the homeless. Each year, a fundraising concert series is presented by singers and celebrities collectively known as "Les Enfoirés".

Death 

In March 1985 Coluche had set a world speed record (252.087 km/hr; 156.64 mph) on a one-km (1000 yard) track in Italy with a 750cc motorcycle.
A little more than a year later, at 16:35 on 19 June 1986, he died after crashing his Honda 1100 VFC into a truck on the "route de Cannes" a road in the commune of Opio, Alpes-Maritimes in southeastern France. He was 41. This event provoked national grief and inspired the album Putain de camion ("damn truck") by his close friend Renaud. Some conspiracy theories have since surfaced, mainly in the book Coluche, l'accident: contre-enquête, alleging that Coluche might have been murdered.

On the occasion of the 30th anniversary of his death, from 6 October 2016 to 14 January 2017, an exhibition about Coluche was held in Hôtel de Ville, Paris.

In March 2011, a bronze statue of Coluche, dressed in his trademark striped dungarees, was unveiled in his hometown of Montrouge (suburb of Paris).

Awards

Coluche won the César Award for "Best Actor" for his role in Tchao Pantin (So Long, Stooge, 1983), one of his few dramatic roles.

Film
The film Coluche : l'histoire d'un mec, directed by Antoine de Caunes and relating the events surrounding Coluche's bid for the French presidency in 1981 was released in France in October 2008. François-Xavier Demaison plays Coluche.

Legacy
Coming from a working-class family and a background of grinding poverty, Coluche fought for the equality of citizens. A law known as the Loi Coluche was passed in 1988, allowing large tax deductions (up to 75% in some cases) for individuals or businesses that donate to specified aid agencies.

The main-belt asteroid 170906 Coluche, discovered by Swiss astronomer Michel Ory in 2004, was named after Coluche.

There are statues of Coluche in his home quarter of Montrouge (suburb of Paris), unveiled in March 2011 (a bronze status of Coluche, dressed with his trademark striped dungaree), and in Le Vigan, Gard in the south of France. Numerous theatres, schools and social spaces bear his name all over France.

In October 2016, the Hôtel de ville de Paris (5, rue de Lobau) opened an exhibition marking the 30th anniversary of his death. It focuses on his radio and movie career up to his announcement of his presidential candidacy. It ran through 7 January 2017.

Filmography

References

External links

Official site of Les restos du cœur (French)
Official site of Les Enfoirés in French and English

1944 births
1986 deaths
Male actors from Paris
French male film actors
French comedians
French humorists
French parodists
French people of Italian descent
People of Lazian descent
Road incident deaths in France
Motorcycle road incident deaths
20th-century French male actors
French male writers
Café de la Gare
20th-century French comedians
20th-century French male writers